The 1971 Memphis State Tigers football team represented Memphis State University (now known as the University of Memphis) as a member of the Missouri Valley Conference (MVC) during the 1971 NCAA University Division football season. In its 13th and final season under head coach Billy J. Murphy, the team compiled an overall record of 5–6 record with a mark of 4–1 in conference play, winning he MVC title. Memphis State defeated San Jose State in the Pasadena Bowl, and outscored all opponents by a total of 255 to 202. The team played its home games at Memphis Memorial Stadium in Memphis, Tennessee. 

The team's statistical leaders included John Robison with 496 passing yards, Paul Gowen with 644 rushing yards and Paul Gowen with 42 points scored, and Stan Davis with 509 receiving yards.

Schedule

Notes

References

Memphis State
Memphis Tigers football seasons
Missouri Valley Conference football champion seasons
Memphis State Tigers football